Fantabulous is an album by Oliver Nelson. It was recorded in 1964 and released that year by Argo Records.

Recording and music
The album was recorded at Universal Recording Corp. in Chicago, on March 19, 1964. Six of the eight pieces were composed by Nelson.

Releases and reception
Fantabulous was released by Argo Records around July 1964. It was reissued on CD by Verve Records, and was part of Mosaic Records' box set of Nelson big band recordings.

Critic Marc Myers wrote in 2015: "What makes this album special are the heavyweight bluesy solos by pianist Patti Bown, alto saxophonist Phil Woods, flutist Jerome Richardson and Nelson's tenor sax. Nelson's writing is strong, complex and varied throughout but always swinging. It's cinematic but not Hollywood. More action TV than big screen."

Track listing
All tracks by Oliver Nelson, unless otherwise noted.

"Hobo Flats" - 4:12
"Post No Bills" - 5:28
"A Bientot" (Billy Taylor) - 3:46
"Three Plus One" - 3:23
"Take Me With You" (Nelson, Grady Tate) - 5:27
"Daylie's Double" - 4:00
"Teenie's Blues" - 4:07
"Laz-ie Kate" - 4:01

Personnel
Oliver Nelson - tenor saxophone, arranger and conductor
Phil Woods - alto saxophone, clarinet
Kenny Soderblom - alto sax, flute
Harold Dessent - alto sax, flute
Bob Ashton - tenor sax, clarinet
Jerome Richardson - baritone saxophone, flute, alto flute
Art Hoyle, Snooky Young - trumpet
Ray Weigand - trombone
Tony Studd - bass trombone
Patti Bown - piano
Ben Tucker - bass
Grady Tate - drums

References

1964 albums
Argo Records albums
Oliver Nelson albums